Farangi-Sazi was a style of Persian painting that originated in Safavid Iran in the second half of the 17th century. This style of painting emerged during the reign of Shah Abbas II, but first became prominent under Shah Solayman II.

Farangi-sazi paintings depicted many types of different scenarios, varying from traditional Iranian scenes, such as portrayal of kings and aristocrats, to European depictions, sceneries, biblical, and mythological events.

Only a few 17th-century artists made paintings in the style of Farangi-sazi, the most prominent ones being Aliqoli Jebadar and Mohammad Zaman.

References

Sources

Further reading 
 
 
 
 

17th century in art
Iranian art
Safavid Iran